Apostolache is a commune in Prahova County, Muntenia, Romania. It is composed of five villages: Apostolache, Buzota, Mârlogea, Udrești, and Valea Cricovului.

References

Apostolache
Localities in Muntenia